This is a list of notable Muslim Christianity scholars. A Muslim Christianity scholar is a Muslim scholar engaged in Islamic Christianity studies.
Jamal Badawi
Abu Ameenah Bilal Philips
Hamza Yusuf
Reza Aslan

See also 
List of Muslim scholars
List of people by belief
List of Muslims

Christianity and Islam
Lists of theologians and religious studies scholars
Christianity scholars